A tabloid talk show is a subgenre of the talk show genre that emphasizes controversial and sensationalistic topical subject matter. The subgenre originated in the United States and achieved peak viewership from the mid-1980s through the end of the 1990s. Airing mostly during the day and distributed mostly through television syndication, tabloid talk shows originated in the 1960s and early 1970s with series hosted by Joe Pyne, Les Crane, and Phil Donahue; the format was popularized by personal confession-filled The Oprah Winfrey Show, which debuted nationally in 1986. The format has since been emulated outside the United States, with the United Kingdom, Latin America and the Philippines all having popular shows that fit the format.

Tabloid talk shows have sometimes been described as the "freak shows" of the late 20th century, since most of their guests were outside the mainstream. The host invites a group of guests to discuss an emotional or provocative topic and the guests are encouraged to make public confessions and resolve their problems with on-camera "group therapy". Similar shows are popular throughout Europe.

Tabloid talk shows are sometimes described using the pejorative slang term "trash TV", particularly when producers appear to design their shows to create controversy or confrontation, as in the case of Geraldo (such as when a 1988 show featuring Ku Klux Klan and Neo-Nazism members, anti-racism activists and Jewish activists led to an on-camera brawl) and Jerry Springer, which focused on lurid trysts – often between family members. Vicki Abt, a professor of sociology and American studies, criticized tabloid TV shows, claiming that they have blurred the lines between normal and deviant behavior. The genre experienced a particular spike during the 1990s, when a large number of such shows were on the air, but which gradually gave way during the 2000s to a more universally appealing form of talk show.

History

The Les Crane Show, a network talk show that aired on ABC as part of its late-night schedule from August 1964 to February 1965, was the first talk show to follow the format. Host Les Crane would bring on controversial guests, interview them in an aggressive but fair style, and take questions from the audience. Crane was the first to interview an openly gay man on-air and frequently interviewed black celebrities, folk singers and other taboo guests; Crane was rebuffed in his efforts to interview lesbians on one of his shows. The format was designed as competition to NBC's long-running franchise, Tonight, and its hard style contrasted with Tonight's more comedic format. The show generated significant controversy and was canceled after six months, later being retooled into a lighter talk show in an effort to boost ratings. Joe Pyne, a Los Angeles-based host, also hosted a similar talk show in syndication, although the focus was more on his confrontations with guests and less on audience participation. The early years of NBC's late-night series Tomorrow with Tom Snyder covered similar tabloid topics without a studio audience (as Tom Snyder did not believed he provided anything an audience would want to see in-person), before the show took on a more celebrity-driven format when Snyder moved to New York City in 1975. In Chicago, Lee Phillip Bell occasionally addressed controversial topics within the context of her long-running talk show as early as the late 1950s, but her show did not have a studio audience.

Trash TV 
The subgenre is sometimes described in pejorative slang as "trash TV", particularly when the show hosts appear to design their shows to create controversy or confrontation. One of the earliest of the post-Oprah shows was Geraldo, which was oriented toward controversial guests and theatricality. As an example, one of the early show topics was titled "Men in Lace Panties and the Women Who Love Them". One 1988 episode featuring white power skinheads ended in a brawl that left host Geraldo Rivera with a broken nose. This incident led to Newsweeks characterization of his show as "Trash TV". The term was subsequently applied to tabloid talk shows at their most extreme; some hosts, such as Jerry Springer, have proudly accepted the label, while other hosts, such as Jenny Jones, resent it.

Jerry Springer would gain a reputation as the most confrontational and sexually explicit, with stories of lurid trysts – often between family members, and with stripping guests and audience members. Although the show started as a politically oriented talk show, the search for higher ratings in an extremely competitive market led Springer to topics often described as tawdry and provocative, increasing its viewership in the process. Common topics included: partners admitting their adultery to each other; women or men admitting to their partners that they were transvestites who had convinced their partners that they were a different sex, or revealing that they were pre- or post-op transsexuals; paternity tests; numerous features on the Ku Klux Klan and racism; and an exposé of shock rock featuring appearances from Eldon Hoke and Gwar. Violence and fights between guests became almost ritual, with head of security Steve Wilkos separating the combatants before fights escalated into something more serious. Though frequently criticized, Springer claimed that he had no creative control over the guests.

Maury would go on to become one of the most enduring examples of the format. Debuting the same season as Springer and likewise initially having a more serious focus, host Maury Povich over time developed a largely formulaic series that carved out a niche: by the 2010s, Maury had become almost synonymous with adversarial DNA paternity testing and polygraph. A typical episode of Maury features a poor woman, often with a checkered sexual background, accusing a past sexual partner of being the father of her child, which the man will categorically deny. At the end of the segment, Povich dramatically reveals the results of the paternity test; if the test proves that the man is not the father, he will celebrate boisterously, sometimes infamously in dance or by running into the audience to high-five audience members, as the mother runs backstage sobbing, while if he is determined to be the father, the mother will strut in triumph, sometimes holding a copy of the results and shoving the results into the now-proven father's face. By the 21st century, Maury had already earned a reputation as being "miles further down the commode" than Springer, and the name of the show would become a proverb for dysfunctional parental situations. Maury would continue until Povich, at age 83, announced his retirement in 2022; the basic format is to be continued in a follow-up show hosted by Karamo Brown.

Controversy
On an episode of The Jenny Jones Show titled "Revealing Same Sex Secret Crush", taped on March 6, 1995, a gay man named Scott Amedure confessed his love for his friend, Jonathan Schmitz. Schmitz reacted with laughter while on the show, but became disturbed by the incident later. He had a history of mental disorder and alcoholism/substance abuse. Three days after the show's initial airing, Schmitz killed Amedure. Schmitz was later convicted of murder and was sentenced to 25 to 50 years in prison. Schmitz was released on parole on August 21, 2017.

Amedure's family filed a lawsuit against the producers of The Jenny Jones Show. In interviews, Jones said that her producers told Schmitz that his admirer could be a male, but Schmitz maintained they misled him into thinking it would be a woman. While under oath, Jones admitted that the show did not want Schmitz to know that his admirer was a man. Amedure's family won the initial ruling, and the show was ordered to pay them $25 million. However, that decision was later overturned by the Michigan appellate court which ruled that the producers were not responsible for what happened to the guests after their appearance on the show.

Decline and resurgence
By the early 2000s, the genre began to decline in popularity with viewers, and certain hosts either saw their shows cancelled due to low ratings (such as Jenny Jones and Sally Jessy Raphaël), died (such as Wally George) or voluntarily ended their shows to pursue other interests (such as Ricki Lake). Many media analysts have attributed the decline in popularity of tabloid talk shows and daytime talk in general to competition from cable television and satellite television, and an increased number of women in the workforce (resulting in a corresponding decline in potential viewers for daytime television, a phenomenon that had also mostly killed off the tabloid talk show's predecessor in daytime lineups, the daytime game show, and would later force cutbacks in soap operas, another daytime staple, as well). Common presumptions indicated that viewers were tiring of the constant recycling of subjects that are often shown on such programs. Another explanation would be that the same audience shifted directly over to the new reality television and court show genre that rose to prominence at around the same time; most reality television and many court shows featured conflicts and raunchy material that would be normally seen in a tabloid talk show. (When Springer's show was canceled in 2018, it was replaced with a court show hosted by Springer.) As early as the late 1990s, hosts such as Oprah Winfrey, and to a lesser extent Montel Williams, began to distance their programs from the genre by refocusing them to incorporate more serious subject matter or staying on stage in the manner of more traditional talk shows. Another example of this trend was Geraldo Rivera ending his show in 1998 to focus on his CNBC talk show Rivera Live full-time. New talk shows also followed the trend of emphasizing less bawdy themes; The Ananda Lewis Show (which ran from 2001 to 2002) made a point of being an alternative to the tabloid style talk shows still airing at the time.

The Phil Donahue Show, seen by many as originating the genre, was cancelled in 1996 as it could not compete with the new crop of shows. Donahue and Rivera would attempt to re-establish their journalistic credentials on cable television: Donahue with a short-lived talk show on MSNBC, and Rivera going back to his "roving reporter" roots, filing reports on CNBC, NBC and Fox News. Maury Povich began hosting a weekend news show in 2006 with wife Connie Chung on MSNBC while still hosting his daytime show. Weekends with Maury and Connie was cancelled after six months due to low ratings, and received harsh reviews by many of the same critics who criticized his daytime talk show. Jerry Springer, while continuing to host his televised "freak show", also hosted Springer on the Radio on Air America in the mid-2000s. The syndicated Judge Hatchett dealt with many of the topics of tabloid talk shows, but was set within the framework of a court show and was more direct in its efforts to intervene in the participants' lives.

Only a handful of the shows from the tabloid talk era remained in production as of 2011, and only one new tabloid talk show premiered between 2000 and that time: The Tyra Banks Show, which ran from 2005 to 2010, was a replacement for Ricki Lake after Lake quit her show. Tyras format was more contemporary in the style of Oprah and Dr. Phil, but had gone over the limits of her show by having her audience members appear in their underwear along with her and most famously, pretending to suffer the effects from rabies to a shocked reaction.

Tabloid shows made a slight comeback in the late 2000s and early 2010s, although with a greater emphasis on self-help than their predecessors (owing to the popularity of shows such as Dr. Phil). Steve Wilkos eventually left Jerry Springer and received his own syndicated talk show, The Steve Wilkos Show, which debuted in 2007. The once-defunct Tribune Entertainment ordered new pilots for tabloid-style talk shows hosted by radio shock jock Bubba the Love Sponge and conservative talk radio host Bill Cunningham, for a possible fall 2011 debut; while Bubba's show was not picked up, The Bill Cunningham Show debuted in limited syndication in September 2011 before moving to The CW (becoming the only talk show on U.S. network television not to be lifestyle- or celebrity interview-oriented) in September 2012; Cunningham continued to host the show until he decided to leave in 2016, at which point Robert Irvine took Cunningham's place. An American version of the British tabloid talk show The Jeremy Kyle Show also launched in September 2011. Ricki Lake and The Queen Latifah Show were both slated to return in September 2012, but with revamped, more mature formats (Latifah's as a more celebrity and lifestyle-focused program and Lake's focusing more on lifestyle and self-help topics) to reflect the hosts' increased age; also set to debut was a show hosted by Trisha Goddard, who hosted a tabloid show in the United Kingdom for several years. Lake's new show lasted only a year, and Queen Latifah's was delayed until September 2013 and was cancelled after two years. Goddard and Kyle also failed to gain traction with their U.S. talk show efforts, and both were canceled after two seasons.

Face the Truth, a half-hour series which debuted in the fall of 2018, attempted to cross the tabloid format with the panel show with host Vivica A. Fox. The program failed however, and was cancelled after one season.

Influence
In the scholarly text Freaks Talk Back, Yale University sociology professor Joshua Gamson credits the tabloid talk show genre with providing much needed high impact media visibility for gay, bisexual, transsexual and transgender people, and doing more to make them mainstream and socially acceptable than any other development of the 20th century. In the book's editorial review Michael Bronski wrote "In the recent past, lesbians, gay men, bisexuals, and transgendered  people had almost no presence on television. With the invention and propagation of tabloid talk shows such as Jerry Springer, Jenny Jones, Jane Whitney, and Geraldo, people outside the sexual mainstream now appear in living rooms across America almost every day of the week."

Gamson credits the tabloid talk show fad with making alternative sexual orientations and identities more acceptable in mainstream society. Examples include a recent Time magazine article describing early 21st century gays coming out of the closet younger and younger, and the decline of suicide rates among gays and lesbians. Gamson also believes that tabloid talk shows caused homosexuals to be embraced in more traditional media. Examples include sitcoms like Will & Grace, primetime shows like Queer Eye and feature films like the Academy Award-winning Brokeback Mountain.

While having changed with the times from her tabloid talk show roots, Winfrey continued to include gay guests by using her show and to promote openly gay personalities like her hairdresser, makeup artist, and decorator Nate Berkus, who inspired an outpouring of sympathy from middle America after grieving the loss of his partner in the 2004 Indian Ocean earthquake and tsunami on The Oprah Winfrey Show. Winfrey's "therapeutic" hosting style and the tabloid talk show genre have been both praised and blamed for leading the media counterculture of the 1980s and 1990s, which some believe broke 20th century taboos, led to America's self-help obsession and created confession culture. The Wall Street Journal coined the term "Oprahfication" to refer to the concept of public confession as a form of therapy and Time magazine named Winfrey one of the "100 Most Influential People" of the 20th century.

Sociologist Vicki Abt criticised tabloid talk shows for redefining social norms. In her book Coming After Oprah: Cultural Fallout in the Age of the TV Talk Show, Abt warned that the media revolution that followed Oprah's success was blurring the lines between normal and deviant behavior. Television critic Jeff Jarvis agreed, saying "Oprah was the one that trashed daytime TV. She took the Donahue format and then brought on the whiny misfits and losers and screamers and shouters, and then everyone, including Donahue, followed her, until it went overboard. Then finally she came back and recanted and said, no, no, now I'm the queen of quality on TV."

Talk shows were often spoofed in mainstream media, with Night Stand with Dick Dietrick being one of the full-length spoofs of the medium (complete with fake guests and audience members asking questions).

Oprah talks to Phil Donahue
In the September 2002 issue of O, The Oprah Magazine, Oprah Winfrey interviewed Phil Donahue at his Manhattan penthouse apartment in what she described as a "full-circle" moment. She wrote in the article's introduction, "If there had been no Phil Donahue show, there would be no Oprah Winfrey show. He was the first to acknowledge that women are interested in more than mascara tips and cake recipes – that we're intelligent, we're concerned about the world around us, and we want the best possible lives for ourselves."

In the interview, Donahue explained that "the show became a place where women discussed issues that didn't naturally come up, and certainly not in mixed company. Much of what we talked about on the air is what women had been talking about in ladies' rooms." Donahue recalled that he finally had to do a show about doctors who hated him because, for the first time, women were challenging their physicians. He also discussed how hosting the show helped him overcome his own taboos. "I put a gay guy on in 1968 – a real live homosexual sitting right next to me. I was terrified ... I'm from University of Notre Dame. And believe me that's the one thing you didn't want to be doing at Notre Dame was hangin' with gay people ... If you don't understand those feelings then you don't understand homophobia. There's a reason for the closet. As the years went by after that show, I got involved in gay politics, and through my activism, I began to realize what it must be like to be born, to live, and to die in the closet."

Donahue also commented on the new crop of tabloid talk shows, such as Jenny Jones – "One-Night Stand Reunions". When Winfrey reminded him "You started all this," he replied, "If that's what you think, I'm proud. What I'm most proud of is that we involved the audience more than anybody else in the game. People who owned the airwaves got to use them in this wild thing called democracy." While both Winfrey and Donahue admitted to having done shows that were "naughty", both wondered if newer shows like Jerry Springer had crossed over into a whole different territory. Reflecting on the genre as a whole Donahue added, "If you want to know about America's culture in the last half of the 20th century, watch some of these programs."

Europe

In Greece
Annita Pania is the longest living representative of the tabloid talk genre in Greece, which reached its peak during the mid-1990s.

In the United Kingdom
American tabloid talk is widely viewed in the United Kingdom. First-run tabloid chat shows are also produced in the United Kingdom, which are largely similar to their American counterparts, albeit more tame in style. Most hosts get more involved with their guests, rather than taking an apathetic attitude in a fashion similar to Jerry Springer and usually the audience is not as involved. Jeremy Kyle, for example, was known for his confrontational attitude towards those on his programme, The Jeremy Kyle Show, while others like Trisha Goddard are more pacifist. Springer himself hosted a series on ITV as Jerry Springer. Vanessa Feltz's programme The Vanessa Show was cancelled by the BBC in 1999, as a result of the discovery that some participants were actually actors cast from a talent agency, although it was known previously for outlandish stories similar to the American shows.

Examples of tabloid talk shows

Current shows
 Karamo (2022–present), hosted by Karamo Brown
 The Steve Wilkos Show (2007–present), hosted by Steve Wilkos

Past shows
 The Ananda Lewis Show (2001–2002), hosted by Ananda Lewis
 The Bill Cunningham Show (2011–2016), hosted by Bill Cunningham
 Carnie! (1995–1996), hosted by Carnie Wilson
 The Charles Perez Show (1994–1996), hosted by Charles Perez
 A Closer Look with Faith Daniels (1991–1993), hosted by Faith Daniels
 Danny (1995–1996), hosted by Danny Bonaduce
 Face the Truth (2018–2019), hosted by Vivica A. Fox
 Forgive or Forget (1998–2000), hosted for most of its run by Mother Love
 Gabrielle (1995–1996), hosted by Gabrielle Carteris
 Geraldo (1987–1998), hosted by Geraldo Rivera
 The Gordon Elliott Show (1994–1997), hosted by Gordon Elliott
 The Greg Behrendt Show (2006–2007), hosted by Greg Behrendt
 In Person with Maureen O'Boyle (1996–1997), hosted by Maureen O'Boyle
 Iyanla (2001–2002), hosted by Iyanla Vanzant
 The Jane Pauley Show (2004–2005), hosted by Jane Pauley
 The Jane Whitney Show (1992–1994), hosted by Jane Whitney
 The Jenny Jones Show (1991–2003), hosted by Jenny Jones
 The Jeremy Kyle Show (U.S.) (2011–2013), hosted by Jeremy Kyle
 Jerry Springer (1991–2018), hosted by Jerry Springer (continues in reruns)
 The Joan Rivers Show (1989–1993), hosted by Joan Rivers
 The John Walsh Show (2002–2004), hosted by John Walsh
 Dr. Joy Browne (1999–2000), hosted by Joy Browne
 Katie (2012–2014), hosted by Katie Couric
 The Dr. Keith Ablow Show (2006–2007), hosted by Keith Ablow
 The Larry Elder Show (2004–2005), hosted by Larry Elder
 Dr. Laura (2000–2001), hosted by Laura Schlesinger
 Leeza (1994–2000), hosted by Leeza Gibbons
 The Mark Walberg Show (1995–1996), hosted by Mark L. Walberg
 The Marsha Warfield Show (1990–1991), hosted by Marsha Warfield
 Maury (1991–2022), hosted by Maury Povich (continues in reruns)
 The Meredith Vieira Show (2014–2016), hosted by Meredith Vieira
 The Montel Williams Show (1991–2008), hosted by Montel Williams (dropped the tabloid format by 2006)
 The Morton Downey Jr. Show (1988–1989), hosted by Morton Downey Jr.
 The Oprah Winfrey Show (1986–2011), hosted by Oprah Winfrey
 The Phil Donahue Show (1970–1996), hosted by Phil Donahue
 The Queen Latifah Show (1999–2001), hosted by Queen Latifah
 The Real (talk show) (2013-2022)
 The Richard Bey Show (1995–1996), hosted by Richard Bey
 Ricki Lake (1993–2004), hosted by Ricki Lake
 The Ricki Lake Show (2012–2013), hosted by Ricki Lake
 The Robert Irvine Show (2016–2018), hosted by Robert Irvine
 The Rob Nelson Show (2002–2003), hosted by Rob Nelson
 Rolonda (1994–1997), hosted by Rolonda Watts
 Sally (1985–2002), hosted by Sally Jessy Raphael
  The Shirley Show (1989–1995), hosted by Shirley Solomon
 Steve Harvey (2012–2017), hosted by Steve Harvey
 Talk or Walk (2001–2002), hosted by Myreah Moore, Steve Turner and Liliya Czarina
 The T.D. Jakes Show (2016–2017), hosted by T.D. Jakes
 The Tempestt Bledsoe Show (1995–1996), hosted by Tempestt Bledsoe
 The Test (2013–2014), hosted by Kirk Fox
 Trisha (2012–2014), hosted by Trisha Goddard
 The Tyra Banks Show (2005–2010), hosted by Tyra Banks
 The Wendy Williams Show (2008-2022), hosted by Wendy Williams

See also
Quality television
Tabloid television
Trial by Media

References

External links
 Trash TV Arrives in Finland – by Anne-Riitta Isohella (Helsingin Sanomat – April 9, 2002)
 Trash TV by Graham Keeley, a report on telebasura in Spain
 Trash TV in Germany
 Trash TV blog in Greece

Television genres

Television terminology
Criticism of journalism
1970s in television
1980s in television
1990s in television
2000s in television
2010s in television
2020s in television